Godar may refer to:
 Godar-e Arbu, Hormozgan Province
 Godar Shah, Hormozgan Province
 Godar, Kermanshah